Fowler Middle School is the name of several middles schools located in the United States:

 Fowler Middle School, in the Frisco Independent School District of Frisco, Texas
 Fowler Middle School, in the Tigard-Tualatin School District of Portland, Oregon